Renovation is the process of improving a structure.

Renovation may also refer to:

 Renovation (convention), the 69th World Science Fiction Convention held in Reno, Nevada, in 2011
 Renovation Products, a distributor of Japanese video games in North America during the early 1990s
 The Renovation, a 2007 deathcore album by My Bitter End
 Renovation, Inc. (TV series), a renovation company based reality TV show

Political parties
 Khmer Renovation, a former royalist political party of Cambodia
 Spanish Renovation (RE), a defunct political party of Spain
 National Renovation (Chile) (RN), a Chilean political party
 Democratic Renovation, a Mauritanian political party
 Civic Renovation Party (PCR), a Dominican Republic political party

See also

 Renovate Now, a political block of France in the Socialist Party
 Remodeling (disambiguation)